Ulopinae is a subfamily of leafhoppers.

Tribes
Cephalelini
Coloborrhinini
Mesargini
Monteithiini
Ulopini

Description

Leafhoppers from this group have hardened, elytra like forewings. They are often brown or black in colour and can be covered with small pits

References

 
Cicadellidae